Kumaon Kingdom was an independent Himalayan kingdom in Kumaon, a region located in the eastern part of the present-day Uttarakhand state of India. It was established around 7th century and remained an independent and sovereign kingdom until 1791.

Etymology 
Kumaon is believed to have been derived from Kurmanchal, meaning land of the Kurma Avatar (the tortoise incarnation of Lord Vishnu, the preserver according to Hinduism). The region of Kumaon is named after as such.

During the time of the British control of the region, between 1815 and 1857 it was also known as Kemaon.

History

Ancient

Kumaon finds mention in the early Hindu scriptures as Manaskhand, according to Skanda Purana the region is believed to be the Birth place of Kurmavtar of Hindu god Vishnu.

Prehistoric dwellings and Stone Age implements have been discovered in Almora and Nainital districts. Initially settled by Kol tribals, the region witnessed successive waves of Kiratas, Khasas and Indo-Scythians(sakas). 

The Kunindas were among the first known indigenous rulers of the region.

Katyuri dynasty

Around 700 CE, the Katyuri dynasty was established by Vasu Dev in the region. They called their state Kurmanchal, the land of Kurma, the second avatar of Vishnu, from which the present name is derived.  Their capital was Kartikeyapura (morden day-Baijnath) and the Gomati Valley came to be known as the Katyur Valley after the ruling dynasty.
during their reign they dominated lands of varying extent from the Katyur Valley (modern-day Baijnath) in Kumaon, between 7th and 11th centuries C.E., and established their capital at Baijnath in Bageshwar district; which was then known as Kartikeyapura and lies in the centre of Katyur Valley.  Brahmadev Mandi (a trading and business center in a flat area of the then Katyuri dynasty) in the Kanchanpur District of Nepal was established by Katyuri king Brahma Dev. Brahmadev Mandi still exists by this name.

At its peak, the Katyuri dynasty of Kumaon extended from Nepal in the east to Kabul, Afghanistan in the west, before fragmenting into numerous principalities by the 12th century. It is believed that from king Dhan Dev and Vir Dev the downfall of this powerful dynasty began. Vir Dev used to collect heavy taxes and forced his people to work as his slaves, King Vir Dev teased his subjects by his tyranny to the extent that he forcibly married his own maternal aunt Tila (Tilottama Devi). It is said that the Kumaoni folk song 'Mami Tile Dharo Bola' became popular from that very day.

Chand dynasty

Sometime in the 10th century, the Chand dynasty was established by Som Chand, He continued to call his state Kurmanchal, and established its capital in Champawat in Kali Kumaon. The Baleshwar and Nagnath temples were built in this city during the 11th and 12th centuries. During this period, learning and new forms of painting (the pahari school of art) developed.

Conflicts and battles
Towards the end of the 17th century, the Kumaon kings attacked Garhwal Kingdom. In 1688, Udyot Chand, erected several temples at Almora, including Tripur Sundari, Udyot Chandeshwar and Parbateshwar, to mark his victory over Garhwal and Doti. The Parbateshwar temple was renamed twice, to become the present Nanda Devi Temple. Gyan Chand, the King of Kumaon ascended the throne in 1698. In 1699 he invaded Garhwal, which was under the King Fateh Shah . He crossed Ramganga River and plundered Sabli, Khatli, and Sainchar. In 1701, Fateh Shah entered in Chaukot (now Syalde region with 3 part, Talla Chaukot (lower), Malla Chaukot (Upper) and Bichla Chaukot (middle)) and Gewar Valley (region of Chaukhutia, Masi, and Dwarahat) as reply. The Kumaonis defeated the Garhwalis in the Battle of Duduli (near Melchauri in Garhwal). In 1707, the Kumaoni forces annexed Juniyagarh in Bichla Chaukot (Syalde), and razed the old fort at Chandpur Garhi, the capital of Garhwal Kingdom. On 13 July 1715, Kumaoni troops clashed with Garhwali troops that were moving to Moradabad and Bareilly. An ally of the Mughal Empire, Kumaon was encouraged to continue fighting Garwhal until they submitted to the Mughal Empire. The Mughal Empire was against Garwhal because of their funding of rebels in Punjab. Twice in the second year of Farrukh Siyar’s reign (between 25 July and 19 December 1713) the Kumaon chief sent him booty obtained in the battles against the combined forces of the Srinagar-Garhwal chief and his Jat and Gujar allies. In early 1715, Kumaon finally captured Srinagar from Garwhal, sending Garwhali chiefs into Mughal courts. In 1742 Ali Mohammed Khan of Rohilkhand invaded Kumaon and annexed Kashipur, Rudrapur, and two other Kumaoni parganas.

During the reign of Baz Bahadur Chand the Kumaoni forces invaded Tibet and captured Hindu pilgrim Kailash Manasarovar along with several forts. He also built the Golu Devta Temple, at Ghorakhal, near Bhimtal, after Lord Golu, a general in his army, who died valiantly in battle, Few years Later, Jagat Chand (1708–20), invaded Garhwal, defeated the ruling King of Garhwal and expelled him from Srinagar, then capital of Garhwal Kingdom. After ruling for few years he bestowed the Kingdom on a Brahmin.

Nepalese invasion and its defeat
In the latter half of the 18th century, the power of Kumaon was on decline, as the prince Mahendra Chand was unable to properly administer the country and conflicts with other neighbouring kingdoms, natural calamities, intrigues and dissensions further weakened the Kingdom.

Seeing this opportunity, in 1791 the Gorkhas invaded Kumaon. Gorkha Army led by the Gorkha commanders Bahadur shah, Kazi Jagjit Pande, Amar Singh Thapa  and Sur Singh Thapa set to attack Kumaon from Doti, One regiment went from Kali Kumaon to Sor, another set out to capture Visung. When the news of the sudden invasion reached Almora,  Mahendra Chand summoned his troops and taking a contingent with him moved towards Gangoli. contingent advanced towards Kali Kumaon.

Amar Singh Thapa with his troops attacked the Kumaoni contingent but got defeated and escaped, however few hours later he came back with huge army and better preparation, surrounded Kumaon from all the direction of west, Mahendra Chand hearing the defeat of his uncle lal singh became nervous and fled, thus Gorkhas finding their path clear reached and captured Almora and Kumaon was annexed to the Kingdom of Nepal.

The Gorkhas rule over Kumaon lasted for 24 years and has been termed as "Cruel and Oppressive" in a number of texts. The only architectural advancements during the period was a road connecting Kali River to Srinagar via Almora.

Kumaon Province

The Gorkhas were defeated by the East India Company in Anglo-Nepalese War and were forced to cede Kumaon to the British as part of the Treaty of Sugauli in 1816. The Kumaon region was joined with the eastern half of the Garhwal region and was governed as a chief-commissionership, also known as the Kumaon Province, on the non-regulation system. In seventy years it was governed by three successive administrators: Mr. Traill, Mr J. H. Batten and Sir Henry Ramsay. The British set up a small administrative unit to govern the region, known as Patwari Halka.

Culture

Language
The Kumaoni language is one of the Central Pahari languages. For a number of reasons, Kumaoni usage is shrinking rapidly. UNESCO's Atlas of the World's Languages in Danger designates Kumaoni as a language in the unsafe category which requires consistent conservation efforts.

Rulers

See also
Kumaoni language
Kumaoni people
List of Hindu empires and dynasties
List of Rajput dynasties

References

Kumaon division
History of Uttarakhand
Empires and kingdoms of India